G 1/19 is a decision issued by the Enlarged Board of Appeal of the European Patent Office (EPO) on 10 March 2021, which deals with the patentability of computer-implemented simulations.

Background
The case, triggered by decision T 489/14 issued on 22 February 2019 by Board of Appeal 3.5.07, deals with a European patent application relating to "a computer-implemented method, computer program and apparatus for simulating the movement of a pedestrian crowd through an environment". "The main purpose of the simulation is its use in a process for designing a venue such as a railway station or a stadium". While Board 3.5.07 acknowledged the analogy with case T 1227/05 (Circuit simulation I/Infineon Technologies) (in which the specific mathematical steps involved in a computer-implemented simulation of an electrical circuit subject to noise were found to contribute to the technical character of the invention), which supported the applicant's case, the Board did not agree with the conclusion reached by the deciding Board in T 1227/05. Eventually, considering this to be a question of fundamental importance, Board 3.5.07 decided to refer three questions to the Enlarged Board of Appeal.

The questions
The three questions referred to the Enlarged Board of Appeal are:

 "In the assessment of inventive step, can the computer-implemented simulation of a technical system or process solve a technical problem by producing a technical effect which goes beyond the simulation's implementation on a computer, if the computer-implemented simulation is claimed as such?
 If the answer to the first question is yes, what are the relevant criteria for assessing whether a computer-implemented simulation claimed as such solves a technical problem? In particular, is it a sufficient condition that the simulation is based, at least in part, on technical principles underlying the simulated system or process?
 What are the answers to the first and second questions if the computer-implemented simulation is claimed as part of a design process, in particular for verifying a design?"

Amicus curiae and oral proceedings
Oral proceedings took place before the Enlarged Board of Appeal on July 15, 2020. The oral proceedings were live streamed over the internet. Additionally, third parties were given the opportunity to file written statements after the initial referral to the Enlarged Board of Appeal, to be considered as part of these oral proceedings, resulting in the filing of 23 amicus curiae briefs.

Decision
The Enlarged Board of Appeal held "that existing case law regarding computer-implemented inventions also applies to computer-implemented simulations", and it retained "its established approach in assessing inventive step, known as the COMVIK approach".

See also
 G 3/08, referral relating to the patentability of programs for computers (referral held to be inadmissible for lack of divergent case law)

References

Further reading

: "Establishing technical character - direct link to physical reality"
: "Establishing technical character - potential technical effect"
: "Establishing technical character - virtual or "calculated" technical effect"
: "Establishing technical character - tangible technical effect"
: "Establishing technical character - computer-implemented simulation methods"
: "Inventive step - problem and solution approach"
: "Inventive step - technical problem - determination of the objective technical problem in general"
: "Inventive step - technical problem - formulation of the objective technical problem"
: "Inventive step - assessment of features relating to mathematical algorithms - simulations"
: "The Vienna Convention on the law of treaties - application of the rules of interpretation"
: "Impact of national decisions on the case law of the boards of appeal - national decisions: no binding effect on the boards of appeal"
: "Referral by a board of appeal - point of law of fundamental importance"

External links
Decision G 1/19 of the Enlarged Board of Appeal of 10 March 2021
Decision T 489/14 (Pedestrian simulation/CONNOR) of 22 February 2019 (referring decision)

G 2019 1